The 1978 U.S. Pro Tennis Championships was a men's tennis tournament played on outdoor green clay courts (Har-Tru) at the Longwood Cricket Club in Chestnut Hill, Massachusetts in the United States. The event was part of the 1978 Grand Prix circuit. It was the 51st edition of the tournament and was held from August 21 through August 28, 1978. Despite pressure to switch to a hard court surface from the Association of Tennis Professionals (ATP) and some leading players, in line with the surface change made that year by the US Open which directly followed the Boston event, the tournament organization elected to remain a clay court tournament in 1978. Several top players including Björn Borg, Guillermo Vilas and Jimmy Connors elected not to play the tournament. Fourth-seeded and defending champion Manuel Orantes won the singles title and the accompanying $32,000 first-prize money. The final was delayed until Tuesday, August 29 due to rain.

Finals

Singles
 Manuel Orantes defeated  Harold Solomon 6–4, 6–3
 It was Orantes' only singles title of the year and the 33rd of his career.

Doubles
 Balázs Taróczy /  Víctor Pecci defeated  Heinz Günthardt /  Van Winitsky 6–3, 3–6, 6–1

References

External links
 International Tennis Federation (ITF) – Tournament details
 Longwood Cricket Club – list of U.S. Pro Champions

U.S. Pro Tennis Championships
U.S. Pro Championships
U.S. Pro Tennis Championships
U.S. Pro Championships
U.S. Pro Championships
Chestnut Hill, Massachusetts
Clay court tennis tournaments
History of Middlesex County, Massachusetts
Sports in Middlesex County, Massachusetts
Tennis tournaments in Massachusetts
Tourist attractions in Middlesex County, Massachusetts